The 2016 BGL BNP Paribas Luxembourg Open was a women's tennis tournament played on indoor hard courts sponsored by BNP Paribas. It was the 21st edition of the Luxembourg Open, and part of the WTA International tournaments category of the 2016 WTA Tour. It was held in Kockelscheuer, Luxembourg, on 17–22 October 2016.

Points and prize money

Point distribution

Prize money

1 Qualifiers prize money is also the Round of 32 prize money
* per team

Singles entrants

Seeds 

 Rankings as of 10 October 2016

Other entrants 
The following players received wildcards into the singles main draw:
 Océane Dodin 
 Mandy Minella 
 Francesca Schiavone

The following players received entry from the qualifying draw:
 Lauren Davis 
 Kristýna Plíšková
 Tereza Smitková
 Carina Witthöft

Withdrawals 
Before the tournament
  Anna-Lena Friedsam → replaced by  Denisa Allertová
During the tournament
  Caroline Wozniacki

Doubles entrants

Seeds 

 1 Rankings as of 10 October 2016

Other entrants
The following pairs received wildcards into the doubles main draw:
  Julia Boserup /  Mandy Minella
  Hsieh Shu-ying /  Hsieh Su-wei

Champions

Singles 

 Monica Niculescu defeated  Petra Kvitová, 6–4, 6–0

Doubles

 Kiki Bertens /  Johanna Larsson defeated  Monica Niculescu /  Patricia Maria Țig, 4–6, 7–5, [11–9]

External links 
 
 Women's Tennis Association (WTA) tournament profil

2016 WTA Tour
2016
Ten
Tennis tournaments in Luxembourg
2016 in Luxembourgian tennis